Daniel James "Gus" Gerard (born July 27, 1953) is an American former professional basketball player. He played for the Carolina Cougars and Spirits of St. Louis of the American Basketball Association (ABA) and the Denver Nuggets, Buffalo Braves, Detroit Pistons, Kansas City Kings and San Antonio Spurs of the National Basketball Association (NBA).

Career

College

Gerard played college basketball at the University of Virginia.

NBA
Gerard was drafted by the Portland Trail Blazers in the third round (14th pick, 50th overall) of the 1975 NBA draft. He was on the 1974–75 ABA All-Rookie First Team and made the 1976 ABA All Star Team.  He played in all 84 games of his rookie season.

Gerard's best NBA season came in 1976–77 when he averaged 10 points a game for the Denver Nuggets.  He finally retired the NBA after the 1980–81 season.

Gerard's ABA and NBA careers were hampered by drug problems; after leaving professional basketball Gerard became a licensed chemical dependency counselor and was involved in a program called Bouncing Back, in which athletes like himself, former Spirits of St. Louis teammate Marvin Barnes and former NBA player Dirk Minniefield travel to schools and businesses, sharing their stories about addiction and recovery.

References

External links
Basketball-Reference.com page on Gus Gerard

1953 births
Living people
American men's basketball players
Basketball players from Pennsylvania
Buffalo Braves players
Carolina Cougars players
Denver Nuggets players
Detroit Pistons players
Kansas City Kings players
People from Uniontown, Pennsylvania
Portland Trail Blazers draft picks
San Antonio Spurs players
Small forwards
Spirits of St. Louis players
Virginia Cavaliers men's basketball players
1974 FIBA World Championship players